The Edmundston Blizzard are a junior ice hockey  team from Edmundston, New Brunswick, Canada. They play in the Maritime Junior Hockey League.

History

Moncton Beavers and also as Richview Junior Canucks and Moncton Hawks were members in the now defunct Nova Scotia Senior Hockey League (1958-1965) from 1961 to 1965.

The Moncton Hawks were New Brunswick Junior Hockey League Junior A champions in 1981, 1982, and 1983.

In 1983, the Moncton Hawks abandoned the faltering New Brunswick Junior Hockey League and joined the Metro Valley Junior Hockey League which until then was a Nova Scotia-based league.

In the summer of 2008, the Moncton Beavers moved to neighbouring Dieppe and became the Commandos.  The Commandos played host to the 2009 Fred Page Cup.

The Commandos lost their first game after moving to Dieppe on September 13, 2008 2-1 to the Yarmouth Mariners.

On November 2, 2016 it was announced that Dieppe could not support a Jr. A team and that the franchise would be relocating to the city of Edmundston, New Brunswick for the start of the 2017-18 season. On February 8, 2017 it was announced that they would become the Edmundston Blizzard, beginning at season end.

In their first season in Edmundston, the Blizzard won the divisional season championship, finished first overall and won the league playoffs.

Season-by-season record

Fred Page Cup
Eastern Canada Championships
MHL - QAAAJHL - CCHL - Host
Round robin play with 2nd vs 3rd in semi-final to advance against 1st in the finals.

Notable alumni
Ryan Clowe
Sid Veysey
Don Wheldon

See also
List of ice hockey teams in New Brunswick

References

External links
Blizzard homepage

Maritime Junior Hockey League teams
Ice hockey teams in New Brunswick
Edmundston
1959 establishments in New Brunswick
Ice hockey clubs established in 1959